Vanadium(II) chloride is the inorganic compound with the formula VCl2, and is the most reduced vanadium chloride. Vanadium(II) chloride is an apple-green solid that dissolves in water to give purple solutions.

Preparation, properties, and related compounds
Solid VCl2 is prepared by thermal decomposition of VCl3, which leaves a residue of VCl2:
2 VCl3 → VCl2 + VCl4
VCl2 dissolves in water to give the purple hexaaquo ion [V(H2O)6]2+. Evaporation of such solutions produces crystals of [V(H2O)6]Cl2.

Vanadium dichloride is used as a specialty reductant in organic chemistry.  As an aqueous solution, it converts cyclohexylnitrate to cyclohexanone. It reduces phenyl azide into aniline.

Structure
Solid VCl2 adopts the cadmium iodide structure, featuring octahedral coordination geometry. VBr2 and VI2 are structurally and chemically similar to the dichloride. All have the d3 configuration, with a quartet ground state, akin to Cr(III).

References

Vanadium(II) compounds
Chlorides
Metal halides